Camilo Coba is a young filmmaker and photographer from Ecuador.

Biography
Camilo Coba
was born in Quito Ecuador, on 7 September 1986. He studied film direction in Buenos Aires Argentina, under Argentine director Manuel Antín, where he won several awards for his individual and group works. He is currently attending the Movie and Video career programme at the Universidad San Francisco de Quito. His first film, El Silencio No Existe (The Silence Does Not Exist), received recognition from the Washington, DC International Film Festival.

He has participated in numerous short film projects in Argentina and Ecuador,  mainly as director of photography and cinematographer.  He represented Ecuador in the Dwight School I.B. Film Festival at the age of 17 years and was awarded the Special Jury Prize. This was the only short film selected from Latin America.

Partial filmography

Buenos Aires, Argentina

Quito, Ecuador

Festivals and awards
Festival I.B. de The Dwight School, New York 2004: Special Prize of the Jury for Popular quitumbe
Programa Arte y Parte de la C.C.E., Quito 2004: Best Short film of the Week for El Chirisiqui
Festival Mirada Joven, Cuenca 2004:
Best Director for El Chirisiqui
Best Photography for Zapatos Rotos
Best Short Subject for El Chirisiqui
Special Mention for Editing for Zapatos Rotos
Nomination for Best Photography for El Chirisiqui
Nomination for Best Experimental for El Chirisiqui
Festival V.I.A.R.T., Caracas 2005: Nomination and Exhibition of El Chiriyacu, Obsesión and Ni Tu Ni Nadie
Washington DC International Film Festival, Washington, D.C. 2007: Best Film in the Making, Sneak Preview, and
Official Selection for El Silencio No Existe

References

External links
D.C.I.F.F DCIFF catalogue
Dwight School IB film festival
Recognitions Intisana School
Youtube Video

1986 births
Living people
Ecuadorian film directors